Charlie Adams (born October 23, 1979) is a former American football wide receiver in the National Football League.

Early years
Charlie Adams was a standout in football and track & field at Cumberland Valley High School in Mechanicsburg, Pennsylvania.  He went on to Hofstra University where set records as the all-time leading receiver in school history, records previously held by Wayne Chrebet and Steven Jackson.  New Orleans Saints  Marques Colston (who is also from Central Pennsylvania) is the latest to hold the all-time yards record at Hofstra.

Professional career
Adams was signed as a college free agent in 2003 by the Denver Broncos. He beat out Jerry Rice for the last Wideout position. Adams was signed in December 2006 by the Houston Texans, but was then released by the team on August 26, 2007.

External links
NFL.com player page
Denver Broncos bio

1979 births
Living people
Players of American football from Pennsylvania
American football wide receivers
Denver Broncos players
Hofstra Pride football players
Houston Texans players
People from Mechanicsburg, Pennsylvania
Rhein Fire players